The Tribulation is future period of strife and judgement in Christian eschatology.

Tribulation or tribulations may also refer to:

Tribulation (film), a 2000 thriller film
Tribulation (band), a Swedish metal band
Tribulation, a 1999 album by Dennis Brown
Tribulation, a 2006 album by Don Carlos
"Trials, Troubles, Tribulations" (song), a 1959 song by E.C. Ball
"Tribulations" (song), a 2005 song by LCD Soundsystem
"Tribulation", instrumental from 666

See also
Trials & Tribulations (disambiguation)